Columbus Fountain also known as the Columbus Memorial is a public artwork by American sculptor Lorado Taft, located at Union Station in Washington, D.C., United States. A centerpiece of Columbus Circle, Columbus Fountain serves as a tribute to the explorer Christopher Columbus. The unveiling in 1912 was celebrated all over Washington, DC over the course of three days with parades, concerts and fireworks gathering tens of thousands of people from all over the world.

Description

Columbus Fountain is a semicircular double-basin fountain with a shaft (h. 45 ft.) in the center. The front of the shaft bears a full-length portrait of Christopher Columbus (approx. h. 15 ft.) wearing a mantle, staring forward with his hands folded in front of him. Beneath him is a ship prow that features a winged figurehead that represents the observation of discovery. A globe, representing the Western hemisphere, is on top of the shaft with four eagles on each corner connected by garland. The left and right sides of the shaft have two male figures decorating them. The right side figure is an elderly man, representing the Old World, and on the left side is a figure of a Native American, representing the New World. The back of the shaft has a low-relief medallion (approx. d. 3 ft.) with images of Ferdinand & Isabella. Two lions (approx. h. 5 ft.), placed away from the base, guard the left and right side of the fountain.

The back of the shaft is inscribed:

TO
THE MEMORY OF
CHRISTOPHER COLUMBUS
WHOSE HIGH FAITH
AND
INDOMITABLE COURAGE
GAVE TO MANKIND
A NEW WORLD
BORN MCDXXXVI
DIED MDIV

The fountain sits in the center of the Columbus traffic circle in front of Union Station.

Congressional legislation

A very different fountain was originally planned for the circle in front of Union Station. But lobbying began in 1906 for a memorial by the Knights of Columbus. The location was not specified at the time.

On March 4, 1907, at 11:00 am, the 59th United States Congress approved HR 13304: That there shall be erected in the city of Washington, in the District of Columbia, a suitable memorial to the memory of Christopher Columbus.

Section 2 provided the creation of a Commission shall be created consisting of: 
 the chairman of the Senate committee on the Library of the Fifty-ninth Congress
 the chairman of the Committee on the Library of the House of Representatives of the Fifty-ninth Congress
 the Secretary of State (Elihu Root)
 the Secretary of War (William H. Taft)
 the Supreme Knight of the Order of the Knights of Columbus
The powers of the commission would include the full authority to select a site and a suitable design and to contract for and superintend the construction of [the] said memorial.

Section 3 provided the Commission $100,000 from the Treasury of the United States not otherwise appropriated.

Designing the fountain
In May 1907 a commission was formed for the memorial fountain headed by prominent members of the Senate, Secretary of State Elihu Root and Secretary of War William H. Taft (who was elected President of the United-States the following year) which served as committee chairman. Upon agreeing on the location for the fountain, a call for designs was requested by artists from America, Italy and Spain. The reason for the three countries stemmed from the committee idea that "if it should be from the hand of an American, the land which Columbus gave to the world; from an Italian, the land which gave Columbus to the world, or from Spain, the land which made Columbus's achievement possible."

On March 20, 1908, details of the general scheme proposed by Architect Daniel Burnham was approved by the commission. The Evening Star enumerates the exacts details of the design:

It was influenced by a fountain designed by Frederick MacMonnies that was displayed at the World's Columbian Exposition in Chicago in 1893. This work depicted a figure of Columbia sitting on a ship with a figure of Fame standing on a ship prow holding a trumpet and a representational figure of Time dominating the stern.

Six sculptors, in particular, were to be invited to this competition by the Committee:
 For Spain: Augustin Querol
 For Italy: Augustus Revolta and Cesare Zoccni
 For the United States: Frederick W. MacMonnies, Daniel C. French and Lorado Taft (a distant cousin of the Committee Chairman in the Taft family).

The competition was to remain open to other sculptors and all submissions were to be sent by the Committee before or on December 1, 1908. The second and third best designers would get $500 each while the first prize would receive $20,000. Frederick W. MacMonnies and Daniel C. French informed the Committee they would be unable to participate as they had other engagements at the time. In all, twenty sculptors submitted proposals for the fountain including: Henri Cronier, Philip Martiny, Charles Keck, Augustus Lukeman, Alfred Sauder, Henry Hering, Charles J. Pike, Pierre Feitu, Leo Lentelli, John C. Hardy, John K. Daniels, Hans Schuler, Giuseppi Donato, J. Otto Schweizer, V.R. Hoxie, Augustin Querol, Louis Weingartner and Lorado Taft.

The models received were put on display in December 1908 in the fifth-floor corridor of the State, War and Navy Departement Building. They were screened until the Committee was ready to review all the proposals. The identities of the artists who had responded were also withheld from the public. By that time, the Committee was composed of Senator George P. Wetmore of Rhode Island, James McCleary of Minnesota, Secretary of State Elihu Root, Secretary of War Luke E. Wright, and Edward L. Hearn, Supreme Knight of the Order of the Knights of Columbus. W. R. Pedigo was the secretary and Col. Charles S. Broniwell. US Army was the executive and disbursing officer. William H. Taft was no longer on the committee as he had resigned as Secretary of War on June 30 to devote himself to his campaign to become the 27th President of the United States.

On February 13, 1909, it was decided that the public would be able to view the models prior to the determination of the winner. The reception of the models by the press was poor. The main complaint was with the Committee and not the artists. The artists had very limited artistic freedom considering the very precise parameters given by the committee to be incorporated in the fountain and it was admirable that they had been able to provide so many different expressions to the status of Christopher Columbus.

On February 27, 1909, the Committee announced the winner of the competition. Lorado Taft was awarded the honor of making the statue of Columbus as well as all the other sculptures surrounding it and $20,000. The second place was given to Philip Martigny and the third place to Augustin Quero, each receiving $500. The remaining of the funds allocated to this project ($79,000) were to be used to provide all the materials (bronze and granite) as well as the labor for carvings, casting, transportation to the site and setting the memorial in place. The newspapers did not fail to mention that the winner was a cousin of President-elect William H. Taft.

Bids for the construction of the fountain and base were open from June 20, 1911 to July 28, 1911. The ad called for "sealed proposals for stonework (granite or marble) for foundations, concrete piles, masonry, etc., and for plumbing and sewers" to be submitted to the committee before midnight on July 28. 1911. The envelopes would be opened publicly. The ad ran in local newspapers from June 26, 1911 to June 29, 1911 as well as on July 24 and 25, 1911. The contract was awarded to J. C. Richardson & Son of New York. The bid was for $21,854 for everything excluding the carvings.

Architect Edward Wilmann of D. H. Burnham & Company was put in charge of the construction of the piece.

Installation and dedication
On October 31, 1911 construction, which was supervised by A. W. Taylor of J.C. Robinson & Son,   began and the piece was installed from March–June 1912.

There was great excitement in anticipation of the upcoming unveiling. A committee was formed to organize the celebration with various subcommittees to organize the various events organized for Friday, June 7, 1912 through Sunday, June 9, 1912.

Friday, June 7
Friday, June 7, Knights of Columbus from around the world gathered in Washington. They visited the tomb of George Washington at Mount Vernon. An ad published in the Washington Herald and Washington Times on June 7 indicates that the Washington-Virginia Electric Railway was the "Official Route" of the Knight of Columbus to Mount Vernon leaving from 12th Street and Pennsylvania Ave.

From 7:30 to 10:30 pm, a public reception was held at the new National Museum (now known as the National Museum of Natural History) which opened the previous year with music played by the United States Marine Band and the presence of the Columbus Memorial commission. 4,000 people attended the event with music and a ball. Among the dignitaries present were DC Commissioner Cuno Hugo Rudolph, Senator Henry F. Ashurst of Arizona and Judge William H. De Lacy of the Juvenile Court.

At the same time, an Automobile pageant was taking place near the White House with 50,000 people lining up on both sides. Participating vehicles gathered at The Ellipse starting at 7:00 pm. The parade moved at 7:30 pm following a predetermined route: Pass between the Treasury Department and the White House to H Street NW; west to 16th Street NW; north to Scott Circle; around the circle back on 16th Street NW to H Street NW; west to 17th Street NW; south to Pennsylvania Avenue NW; east to Executive Avenue NW; south between White House and State, War and Navy Building; back of White House to Pennsylvania Avenue NW; east to the Peace Monument; back over Pennsylvania Avenue NW to the White Lot.

Saturday, June 8
The Knights of Columbus headed up the dedication ceremony on June 8, 1912. It was estimated that at least 150,000 people were expected to attend the opening. Congress supplied an extra $6,000 for expanded police security, with the Knights requesting at least 500 officers to participate. $10,000 was contributed by the Knights of Columbus for the event decorations, supplies and general planning.

A parade was planned starting at 3:00 pm featuring an estimated 50,000 participants for the civic portion. General Robert K. Evans, Chief of Military Affairs, served as the parade marshal, riding at the front of the parade. He was followed by the Army Contingent composed of the following (in order):
 Battalion of the US Engineers (Washington Barracks)
 Battalion of the Coast Artillery Corps (Art. Dist. of Potomac)
 Squadron of the Fifteenth Cavalry (Fort Myer)
 Battalion of the Third Field Artillery (fort Myer)

This was followed by the Navy and Marines with each its own band playing. The civic portion of the parade was composed of Knights of Columbus members from all over the country. The Civic portion went in the following order:
 All Fourth degree Knights
 New York and New Jersey Knights
 Pennsylvania Knights
 Maryland and District of Columbia Knights
 Virginia, West Virginia and all southern Knights
 Illinois, Ohio and all western Knights. The North Dakota delegation brought Ignatius Court from the Devils Lake Sioux Tribe in complete wardress.
 All other organizations (including several Italian societies)

Five Parade floats depicting Christopher Columbus' trials and tribulations followed behind. The floats included:
 "Reception of Columbus" by King Ferdinand (Massachusetts delegation)
 "Columbus before the King" (New York delegation)
 The "Departure of Columbus" from Europe (Pennsylvania delegation)
 The caravel in which Columbus set sail (The United Italian Society of Washington)
 The landing (District of Columbia knights)

The route of parade was as follow: Pennsylvania Avenue NW to 2rd Street NW; north on 2rd Street NW to F Street NW; on F street NW to Massachusetts Avenue NW. This is where the reviewing stand stood, where President Taft and his guests reviewed the parade on Union Station Plaza. From Massachusetts Avenue to Stanton Square (later known Stanton Park) where the parade was reviewed by the Knights of Columbus.

The unveiling of the artwork was done on a beautiful sunny day with thousands of citizens and visitors attending the ceremony. Secretary of State Philander Knox was the presiding officer. The ceremony followed this order. An invocation was given by Mgr. Thomas Shahan, the Rector of the Catholic University of America. It was followed by an address from Chief Justice Victor J. Dowling. The Marine Band played. Representative James McCreary, a member of the original Committee, talked about the significance of Christopher Columbus. Marquis Luigi Cusani-Confalonieri, Italian Ambassador to the United States pulled the cords after some remarks. As the Stars and Stripes fell away from the statue, a battery from the 3rd Field Artillery from Fort Myer fired a 21-gun salute. Wreaths were laid by several officials and organizations. President Taft provided the formal address followed by a selection of pieces performed by the Marine Band. All the ushers at the ceremony were all members of the Sons of the American Revolution.

At 8:00 pm, a public banquet was held at the Convention Hall at the intersection of K Street NW and 5th Street NE with 1830 Knights of Columbus present. Plates were sold for $10. In honor of the visiting Knights, the District Building was illuminated from 8:00 pm to 11:00 pm and an invitation issued to the public to visit the building from 9:00 am to 3:00 pm. Police forces were also on standby to accommodate this increase in population.

At the same time, a firing of salute was taking place near the White House followed by fireworks from 8:30 pm to 9:30 pm. A large crowd gathered on The Ellipse to watch as stars and as the Santa Maria were displayed.

Sunday, June 9
On Sunday at 7:00 am, veterans assembled at the St. Patrick's Catholic Church for military mass with Cardinal James Gibbons. An estimated 10,000 people were believed to attend the mass. At 8:00 pm, a final public concert was held at the Convention Hall featuring the US Marine Band and Symphony Orchestra of sixty pieces.

Columbus Day
Every year Columbus Day celebrations are held featuring the US Marine Corps Band and a wreath laying ceremony.

Condition and conservation
It was added to the National Register of Historic Places, on March 7, 1968.

In October 1991 the memorial was spray painted with graffiti reading "500 Years of Genocide" during a wreath-laying ceremony by the Knights of Columbus ("500 Years of Faith") and the National Park Service removed it with surface cleaners. In March 1994 the work was surveyed by the Save Outdoor Sculpture! program and was described as needing treatment.

As of 2014, The fountain has fallen in a state of disrepair. According to the Union Station Redevelopment Corporation (USRC), the fountain suffers from significant structural issues. The statues have been painted over to hide the discolorations and the fountain basins are boarded up to avoid further damage as the plumbing does not function. On May 25, 2016, the National Park Services and the USRC announced that Fountain had been selected as one of 20 historic places to compete for a share of $2 million in grants under the National Trust for Historic Preservation's Partners in Preservation program.

See also
 List of public art in Washington, D.C., Ward 6

References

Further reading

Carrier, Thomas J. Washington, DC: A Historic Walking Tour. Arcadia Publishing, 1999. .
Ciesielski, Gregory R. Christopher Columbus Memorial Fountain. Discovery! Journal of the Christopher Columbus Philatelic Society, Vol. 18, No. 2, April 2000.
Highsmith, Carol & Ted Landphair. Union Station: A Decorative History of Washington's Grand Terminal. Chelsea Pub, 1988. .
Moeller, G. Martin. AIA Guide to the Architecture of Washington, D.C. The Johns Hopkins University Press, 2006. .

External links

Columbus Fountain on dcMemorials
Columbus Monument
Delaware Avenue & Columbus Circle, NE Historical Information from The Historical Marker Database
National Columbus Celebration Association

Religious figures among those immortalized in Washington's statuary – including many works dedicated by the Knights of Columbus
Revisiting the Christopher Columbus Memorial Fountain by Ben Schuman Stoler

Fountains in Washington, D.C.
Statues in Washington, D.C.
Monuments and memorials to Christopher Columbus
Capitol Hill
Monuments and memorials on the National Register of Historic Places in Washington, D.C.
Artworks in the collection of the National Park Service
Marble sculptures in Washington, D.C.
Sculptures by Lorado Taft
1912 sculptures
Knights of Columbus
Sculptures of Native Americans in Washington, D.C.
1912 establishments in Washington, D.C.
Outdoor sculptures in Washington, D.C.
Northeast (Washington, D.C.)
Statues of Christopher Columbus
Sculptures of lions
Vandalized works of art in Washington, D.C.